The Playa de Las Canteras (Las Canteras beach; Beach of the Quarries) is the main urban beach of the city of Las Palmas de Gran Canaria (Gran Canaria, Canary Islands), one of the most important beaches of the Canary Islands. 

Las Canteras has an Environmental Management System certified according to the UNE-EN ISO 14001 norm and a Universal Accessibility Certificate for bathing services for people with reduced mobility, certified by the same organization.

Playa de Las Canteras has just hoisted the Q for Tourism Quality flag and has been awarded the European Union Blue Flag, the ISO Environmental Management Certificate and the Universal Accessibility Certificate, making it one of the most highly valued beaches in Spain.

The awards "Travellers' Choice Playas 2013" places Las Canteras in the number 10 position in Spain, after a study that has recognized the quality of 276 beaches located in Africa, Asia, the Caribbean, Central America, Europe, Middle East and USA, among which is Playa de Cofete, in Fuerteventura, in the number 6 position, and headed by the Playa de Las Catedrales in Ribadeo.

The name of the beach has always been linked to "La Barra" (The Bar), a sedimentary rock of sandstone and calcareous depositions that runs parallel to the shore, providing shelter from the north swell and giving it a personality of its own. Formerly it was known as "Playa del Arrecife" (Reef Beach), because La Barra emerged from the water like a reef. Later, it was exploited as a quarry (Spanish: cantera) to extract the rock that was used, among other uses, for numerous constructions in the city, such as the Cathedral of the Canary Islands. In memory of this practice, now abandoned, the name of Playa de Las Canteras (Beach of the Quarries) survives today.

Situation 

Las Canteras extends on the western side of the isthmus of Guanarteme, once a tongue of dunes and sands that joined the mountains of the peninsula of La Isleta, located to the northeast, with the rest of the island of Gran Canaria. The beach is the longest of the existing ones in the city. It is oriented to the northwest, in what is known as the arch or bay of El Confital, and extends from the foothills of La Isleta to just before the mouth of the ravine of Tamaraceite, for just over three long kilometers of fine golden sand.

Along most of this length, the beach is sheltered from the Atlantic currents by a natural bar of sandstone and reefs, which is popularly known as "La Barra" and can be reached by swimming from the shore. On the inner side of the coast, runs the "Paseo de Las Canteras", a pedestrian walkway that runs parallel to the entire beach from the vicinity of the Alfredo Kraus Auditorium to the area known as "La Puntilla" and from there, in extension, until you reach the vicinity of the Playa del Confital, a place that some years ago was only frequented by surfers and bodyboarders, where it generates what many consider to be the best right-hand wave in Europe.

Playa de Las Canteras comprises three areas that correspond to the arcs and inflections that it makes on the nearshore. Each of them has certain morphological characteristics.

 Arco norte (Northern arch)

This arch, commonly known as Playa de Las Canteras or Playa Grande, has an extension of approximately 1,120 meters, while its width varies between 20m in the southern area and 120m in the central part, passing through 80m in the northern area of La Puntilla. This is the most protected area of the beach, since, on the one hand, during most of the year it is sheltered from the waves by a natural barrier reef (La Barra), and on the other hand, because it hardly suffers the effects of storms of north and northeast component, being in the shaded area provided by the mountains of the peninsula of La Isleta. The barra principal or barra grande ("main bar" and "big bar" respectively) is the most exploited of all, as it is frequented by swimmers who reach it from the shore. On this bar, when it is emerged at low tide or at dawn, you can find a varied and rich ornithological fauna, being frequent to observe a fairly large community of seagulls on it. La Puntilla is the final end of the beach and also the area where the greatest amount of sand is accumulating, due to the natural dynamics of dragging that exists in Las Canteras and that has been seriously damaged with the urban development of the isthmus.

 Arco central (Central arch)

It is 760 meters long and about 80 meters wide in its southernmost part, narrowing in the central area to form a beach of just 40 meters on its northern side. At this point we find a small arch that forms the "Playa Chica", one of the most characteristic points of Las Canteras. This area has a length of 120m and a width up to the low tide level of 80m at the central edge of the arch and only 20m at its ends. The shore of this arch is the most rocky and stony of all the Playa de Las Canteras, so the transport of sand at this point is not as variable as in the southern arch, existing rather a loss of this. This central arch is protected by the peña central (central rock), the southern head of the main bar and a small bar with similar characteristics but separated from the main one, known as "la barra amarilla" (the yellow bar). At 60m from the shore is the most famous peña of Playa de Las Canteras, the "Peña de la Vieja", which has about 15m in diameter at its base. Also in this area you can find other peñas and numerous rocks that mostly protrude during low tides, while others do so permanently. The point of separation between the barra amarilla and the barra principal is popularly known as "el pasadizo" (the passageway), since it is deep enough so that, even at low tide, light ships can pass through it. This gap is also used by a large part of the fish fauna to access the interior of the dock.

 Arco sur (Southern arch)

Corresponds entirely to the Playa de La Cícer or Playa de Guanarteme, and also includes Punta de Núñez and Los Muellitos, both areas behind the Alfredo Kraus Auditorium. This arc extends along a coastal strip of 1,080 meters long and an average width of 80 meters at low tide. Since this beach area is not protected by La Barra, its profile is very changeable as it is more exposed to the waves. Nevertheless, this beach area is mostly made up of fine-grained sand, somewhat denser than the rest of Playa de Las Canteras (which makes it difficult to drag it out to sea), with a permanent accumulation of pebbles at its southern end, next to Los Muellitos, as well as some stony areas in the central area coinciding with the low tide limit. The "Punta de Núñez" is a rocky outcrop that is quite depressed by the swell of the entire northern sector. "Los Muellitos" is the name given to two breakwaters located perpendicular to the Punta de Núñez, forming between them the Playa de Los Muellitos, 50m long and made up of peebles. One of the breakwaters is approximately 100m long and the other, located further south, about 60m. Both are 25m wide. These breakwaters form, together with La Puntilla (at the northern end of the beach) the promontory where Playa de Las Canteras is located. Approximately in the middle of this southern arch is the mouth of the ravine of La Ballena, a dry streambed with sporadic runoffs that only reach the beach during the rainy season.

Map of the area

Geological formation 
La Isleta was originally an isolated islet, separated from the island of Gran Canaria by a strip of sea about a kilometer wide. On its southeast side was the isthmus of Guanarteme, a tongue of land that allowed La Isleta to become a peninsula, joining it to the rest of the island. The isthmus was approximately 4.12 km long and just over 200 meters wide at its narrowest part, opening out into a cup shape at its ends. The western side of the isthmus is occupied by Playa de Las Canteras, while the eastern side houses the facilities of Puerto de La Luz.

The dune field was formed with the sands that the ocean current deposited on the beach and that the trade winds then dragged to the mainland. Until the middle of the 19th century, the dune field remained practically intact, as shown in maps of the time, but the expansion of the city caused its progressive deterioration until it disappeared almost completely.

Despite its link to La Isleta, there is no data to determine the composition of the geological material found under the isthmus. Only the Finnish geologist Hausen, in a study carried out in 1962, has been able to express a theory in this matter. According to Hausen, the entire city of Las Palmas de Gran Canaria is located on a fluvial terrace of phonolitic conglomerates, sedimented after the Miocene through contributions from the Guiniguada ravine, coinciding with a notable marine regression of the island due to the increase of its volcanic activities, and the emergence of La Isleta as an islet, also due to the volcanic eruptions that occurred until the recent Quaternary period.

The marine currents between La Isleta and Gran Canaria made the consolidation of the strait difficult, delaying it for some time until the last fluvial episodes, but when it took place it was accompanied by cementation due to the sedimentation of calcareous contributions of the abundant marine fauna that existed, formed by lumaquelas and ostreidos. Finally, the incessant contribution of these materials caused the clogging of the small strait forming the isthmus of Guanarteme that today joins La Isleta, now a peninsula as a tombolo, with the city of Las Palmas de Gran Canaria and the rest of the island.

The primitive tombolo formed a beach whose shores reached to where La Barra is located today. The fresh water that reached the coast from the ravine of La Ballena, contributed to the hardening of the beach until it became compacted, thus forming the rock that can be seen today. Over the years, the pounding of the waves and the prevailing winds shaped La Barra and the rocks that jut out of the sea, giving them the peculiar shape that has survived to the present day.

Thus was born Playa de Las Canteras, which for a long time was called Bahía del Arrecife. It consists entirely of fine blond sand, found in it small crystals of olivine and pyroxene, as well as an organic component of crushed shells, which is known in the Canary Islands with the name of confite. From the water emerge, at low tide, rocky remains that probably correspond to the substrate where the sand of the beach and the isthmus itself are settled.

History 

The tongue of dunes and sand that was the isthmus of Guanarteme has disappeared today, leaving the Playa de Las Canteras, to the west, and Playa de Las Alcaraveneras, to the east, as a small reminder of what was once the extensive dune field that made up the isthmus.

It was at the end of the 19th century when the area, until then deserted, began to be populated. Favored by the strength of the Puerto de La Luz, on the dune field, were settling the houses that would end up covering it completely to consolidate the urban neighborhood of Santa Catalina.

The dunes were a consequence of the dragging of sand from the beach, which, as the buildings rose and modified the system of sand circulation, slowed its advance and caused its accumulation, so they gradually gained space to the sea, thus widening the surface of the isthmus.

The first concrete references to the beach date back to the 15th century, although before that, around the years 1410 and 1460, plans were already published in which La Isleta appeared separated from the island as if the isthmus was overflowed by water most of the time. At the time of the Conquest of the island (1479), it was already recorded that the transfer between the port and the city usually had to be done by boat.

In the 16th century, the Puerto del Arrecife is mentioned as a place of embarkation and disembarkation, but subordinated to that of Las Palmas and a century later, around 1686, the first plan of the isthmus drawn by Pedro Agustín del Castillo appears, in which the Bahía del Arrecife appears with a series of reefs that represented La Barra. At the end of the 17th century, the city was not as extensive as it is today, so the beach was a few kilometers away from the town. That is why it was a practically deserted and unknown place for the citizens, only frequented by those who dared to visit it walking or by cart between fields and dunes, or crossed it to go fishing or hunting to La Isleta or, simply, for commercial reasons since the area was a common anchorage for ships, protected in the shelter of La Isleta.

Centuries later, in the 19th century, work began on the road that would connect the beach and the port with the urban center (1855) and with it, in 1890, the first public streetcar ride from Vegueta to Puerto del Refugio. Thanks to these means, the beach began to be timidly frequented by the citizens. Around 1910 the first buildings had already been erected and the beach was frequented by about two hundred people on its best days, but most of them were strollers. The morals of the time, which frowned upon bathing on the beach as we now know it, reduced the number to a few bathers.

Urban development 
It is from the end of the 19th century when the beach began to be known by the name of Las Canteras. The origin of the toponym is due to the extractions that were made in La Barra of sandstone for the filters of the popular canary water batteries or distilleries, a practice that, if it had not been suspended at the time, would have ended up making the reef disappear and with it part of the beach. In those years, the boom of the San Telmo pier brought with it a growing activity of shipwrights and other craftsmen who found in the Bahía del Arrecife the main carenero. Except for a small hamlet in the area of La Puntilla where these artisans lived and worked, the rest remained uninhabited.

With the arrival of the year 1883, the construction works of the Puerto de La Luz began and the first urbanization plans also began to emerge. That same year, the municipal architect Francisco de la Torre came up with a project in which the beach was framed by a large street, the largest that was planned for the sector, anticipating the idea of the pedestrian promenade that would be built in the future as we know it today. A few years after the project was approved, the first houses began to be built, mainly summer residences for wealthy families.

From that time some urbanistic relics of the vacation past of the first years of the 20th century are conserved in Playa de Las Canteras, when the "rich" families of Las Palmas came to Las Canteras to spend their summer vacations in splendid beach houses for that purpose, corresponding to certain families of the urban bourgeoisie, such as Cayetano lnglott Ayala, the brothers Amaranto and Teófilo Martínez de Escobar, Juan Rodríguez Quegles, Agustín Sánchez Rivero, Agustín Báez Navarro or the bathhouse on the same Playa de Manuel Reina Pérez. It was almost at the same time that Playa de Las Canteras was receiving the first adventurous English tourists who marveled at the beauty of this beach and the transparency of its waters.

Within the group of buildings that are preserved we can highlight the Marine Command (Fernando Navarro, 1913) of eclectic elevation and three floors with towers on the corners; the Mesa y López building (Miguel Martín, 1923), a multi-family recreational house, which responds to the models of Central European architecture with a very attractive play of volumes, roofs and visible materials; and the San José clinic (Laureano Arroyo, 1895 and Rafael Masanet, 1928), a home-asylum, hospital and school for workers and their children, which was the initiative of Bartolomé Apolinario.

This interesting building, which is still a hospital, is arranged around a central courtyard, has two floors in the long bay that opens to the sea, with a large arcade to which the rooms on the first floor open and a gallery overhung on corbels and brackets on the upper floor, which is finished at the ends with octagonal pieces. Next to it, on Padre Cueto Street, is the church of San José (Laureano Arroyo, 1905).

During the first decades of the 20th century, between 1920 and 1930, Las Palmas de Gran Canaria became a winter resort, visited annually by some 3,000 tourists. These tourists, mostly English, stayed in the fourteen hotels that the city had at that time, nine of which were located in the port area, given the great attraction that the Playa de Las Canteras had already achieved by that time. As a result, the city council decided in 1936 to adopt as the definitive urban development project that of the architect Miguel Martín Fernández de la Torre, starting the works of the promenade the following year and maintaining its original physiognomy, except for small changes, until the total remodeling works that concluded at the end of the 90s.

The physiognomy of the area of Playa de Las Canteras has been radically modified over time. From the two-story bourgeois houses that existed until the middle of the 20th century, there is now tourist accommodation that coexists with the construction and renovation of private homes and apartments.

Throughout the 20th century there were several urbanization and planning projects that were not entirely put into practice. For example, that of the Bilbao architect Secundino Zuazo Ugalde in 1943, a professional with successful approaches that were executed in other areas of the city, but who had a very unique proposal for Las Canteras that, fortunately, was not put into practice by the city council. Zuazo, in his planning, closed the beach with two dikes parallel to the coast, with which he gained land from the sea to be used for buildings, public spaces and the construction of a small sports pier; a project that, had it been carried out, would have eaten up half of the beach, leaving La Barra on the shore.

In 1991 the city council decided to give a facelift to the beach and faced the renovation of the promenade that since its construction in the 30's had only been subjected to patches and the annual repainting of its railings. To this end, the decision was made to carry out a forward-looking project and to this end the entire pavement, street lighting and street furniture were renewed, and a series of complementary works were also carried out, such as the organization of the piping and the creation of a service gallery that runs along the entire subsoil of the promenade and prevents the opening of ditches and trenches on the new pavement when repairs are needed. The work, given its extension and scope, had to be carried out in several phases starting in the area of La Isleta until reaching the vicinity of the Alfredo Kraus Auditorium in the neighborhood of Guanarteme and included, in addition to the renovation of the avenue, the renovation of each of the streets that converge on it and were pedestrianized with the same materials as those used in the promenade.

Thus, Las Canteras went from being a classic, familiar and obsolete beach to being transformed into an avant-garde beach, with modern and functional furnishings, with access and services for people with reduced mobility and connected by a complete network of transport and communications. Since then, the modernization and growth of Las Canteras has continued, and the promenade has been extended at each end. At one end is La Puntilla, where the beach used to end and from where the promenade to the vicinity of El Confital starts, which along its route adapts to the special orography of the area, more abrupt and cliffy, highlighting the beauty of the volcanic rock and the numerous peñas that dot the way. At the other end, the beach traditionally ended at La Cícer. Now it reaches the vicinity of the Auditorium and the Plaza de la Música.

The arrival of tourism 

The English and the French were the first to bring tourists to Las Canteras during the first decades of the 20th century. They came to the island to work in the businesses installed in the incipient Puerto de La Luz, but they ended up settling in the city, where they came to create an important colony that came to extend many of their customs among the residents of the Canary Islands. The influence of the English was notorious and soon, those who had come to work, began to make arrangements to bring their compatriots in small organized trips.

The bourgeois and aristocratic elites of the 19th century had initiated the fashion of sea bathing which, after the First World War, began to be so among the middle bourgeoisie. It was at the beginning of the 20th century when it is known that tourists bathed in the beaches of the city and the spas were advertised in the press. The novel "Gran Canaria" by Archibald Joseph Cronin is a reflection of how this primitive tourism developed.

Agatha Cristie or Bronislaw Malinowski visited the city as tourists at that time and the hotel structure of the city, initiated with English real estate investments, emerged as a winter resort. The paradisiacal climate, a land of spring and eternal flora, the valleys where all the birds sing, the palm tree transplanted from the desert and a radiant sun was enough attraction for the Europeans. This also influenced the Canary Islanders who, although many had grown up on the beach and enjoyed its richness, were accustomed to another use, perhaps more oriented towards earning their livelihood through fishing and the work of the sea.

In the 1960s the city received an influx of Swedish tourists, and it was they who set the style and broke the rules of dress on the beach, going not without contradictions from swimsuits that covered much of the body to bikinis and the Top Less.

When World War II ended, a balneario town sprang up around the beach. While the Canary Islanders discovered the beach and began to build their first houses, the English already had some important buildings and had filled the beach with huts, like balnearios, so that their clients could change their clothes and go out on the sand. It was a non-directed tourism, with special treatment given directly by the transport company or the hotel itself. The hotel business was largely controlled by the British and the traveler was a secondary commodity, complementary to maritime traffic.

The world crises put an end to that intimate tourism, but the English were not resigned to miss the paradise and, in the 50's, the Canary Islanders began to see the potential of organized tourism. Thus, the area of Las Canteras was going to become a spa town, a residential area for tourism, which was going to be built without any previous infrastructure. The city did not have hotels with sufficient capacity and there was no other tourist destination in the whole island; but next to Puerto de La Luz there was an area that would not take long to be discovered: Las Canteras.

The first tourist establishments that, in 1956, were opened on the beach, were old houses in the area of La Puntilla converted into residences that came to add about four hundred beds. Years later, tourism was already seen as a good business by businessmen and authorities and the need arose to offer higher quality accommodations in the area. Thus arose, in 1964, the "Hotel Caracolas", although years earlier the "Hotel Gran Canaria" had already opened its doors, built in an area of the beach opposite La Puntilla, which was the one that at that time was bringing together the lodging offer of Las Canteras. Other small hotels and residences followed, such as the "Hotel Verol", a small three-star hotel inaugurated in 1967 and still open today. Years later, an emblematic hotel was built, the "Hotel Cristina", which is still in operation today. Inaugurated in 1970, it was a hotel located in a privileged location on the beach, offering maximum comfort to the 600 guests it was able to accommodate and had more than 300 rooms, all with sea views on both sides of the isthmus, the beach and the port. Another important establishment competing with the Cristina was the "Hotel Reina Isabel", opened in 1965 and today owned by Bull Hotels.

At the end of the 70's, tourism in Las Canteras fell and was partly diverted to other destinations. One of the measures taken to address this problematic situation was to rehabilitate the environment and create future infrastructure with higher quality. Thus, in the last decade of the 20th century, the reconversion and enlargement of the promenade using new materials began.

Everything that gave more than sun light to the capital had not known any renovation since the 1930s.

The public administration got down to work and the remodeling work began in January 1991 and included, in addition to the renovation of the Avenida de Las Canteras, the streets that ended in it. In this way it managed to achieve again the prestige that the continuous years of neglect had caused it to lose.

Surroundings and environment 

 La Barra

By way of coral protection, parallel to the beach, Las Canteras has a tongue of two kilometers long two hundred meters from the shore. Popularly known as La Barra, it is a sedimentary rock of sandstone and calcareous deposits interspersed with conglomerates more than 100,000 years old, which protects a large part of the beach and prevents the tides from dragging and transporting the sand out to sea. It is the element that gives personality to the beach and the way in which it is protected from the harshness of the Atlantic. La Barra is a stronghold of the important fish wealth of the beach, to which it owes much of its existence.

 El Confital

The Playa de El Confital is located on the peninsula of La Isleta and is a natural extension of Playa de Las Canteras. The area usually used as a beach covers about two kilometers, although the coastal strip is much larger. It is formed by rocky boards with a layer of thick sand at the end of them. This beach is admired for the cleanliness of its waters, the perfection of its waves and the beauty of its rocks and cliffs. Until a few years ago, there was a small shanty town on the beach, but it was recently eradicated and the land of El Confital became public domain again. In mid-2007, work began to clean up and adapt the area for public enjoyment.

 Juguete del Viento

Polychrome iron mobile located in the Plaza de La Puntilla, is one of the last works made by the multifaceted Lanzarote artist César Manrique, in 1991, before his death.

 Real Club Victoria

Founded in 1910, the club has played an important role in the cultural and sporting life of the city, articulating the social life in the surroundings of La Puntilla, with sport as a background. The headquarters building is the work of the Tenerife architect Marrero Regalado, built in the thirties and forties of the twentieth century and is especially interesting for its architectural composition. Next to the headquarters, meeting point of its members and place of development of its activities, the Club Victoria has a sailing school located under the Plaza de La Puntilla.

 Mercado del Puerto

It is possibly the clearest example of the cast-iron architecture of Gran Canaria. It is located between Las Canteras and Puerto de La Luz, occupying an area of 1700 square meters. It is a square and diaphanous enclosure, whose columns are made of cast iron and of laminated or forged sweet iron those components that had to suffer bending or extension efforts, such as the roofs. Since mid-2012, the Market has broadened its horizons and has become a gastronomic reference point in the city, offering from its premises, bar restaurants, different products to taste, local seafood, Scandinavian products, Japanese food or olives from the country.

 San José Clinic

One of the historic buildings of the beach, built in 1900, which in turn is a well-known meeting point. Other historic buildings such as the Millares Brothers Cinema or the Pala Club have given way to more modern constructions. The Casa Asilo de San José, an eclectic style building, originally designed by the architect Laureano Arroyo in 1896, was renovated in the 1920s by Rafael Masanet, who added an upper floor with a gallery, very characteristic of a building with a welfare character.

 Marrero Wall

According to the Foundation for the Ethnography and the Development of the Canary Crafts (FEDAC), Autonomous Organism of the Cabildo of Gran Canaria, the Marrero wall is located in the section of the "avenue of the Playa de Las Canteras of Las Palmas de Gran Canaria, in the part known as Playa Chica, in its confluence with the end of Dr. Grau Bassas street, in its number 60, as well as the end of Sargento Llagas street". The surname Marrero that designates this location recalls the efforts of the pioneer Antonio Marrero Pérez, who in 1920 was forced to build a wall to protect his family from the fierceness of the sea; thus "this wall becomes the seed of what will be the layout of the future promenade of Las Canteras" which has been commemorated on a plaque that can be visited at the site.

 Sculptures on the promenade

The Paseo de Las Canteras is a small open-air museum where there is room for a multitude of sculptural proposals of the most varied styles. Many of them represent illustrious beachgoers and popular characters. Some of these figures are Calypso (1998, Manuel González, in bronze), dedicated to Jacques Cousteau; Homenaje a los pescadores fallecidos (Homage to the deceased fishermen), by Chano Navarro Betancor, in La Puntilla; bust of Pepe Gonçalves (1994, by Tony Gallardo, in cast bronze), soccer player and founder of the Real Club Victoria; Los niños de la barra (The children of the bar, 1993), bronze sculptural group by Juan Bordes Caballero; bust to the poet Saulo Torón and Doctor Apolinario Macías; Mary Sánchez (2005), life-size bronze statue of the folkloric, work of Ana Luisa de Benítez; La mujer y su sombra (The woman and her shadow; the nineties of the 20th century), work in corten steel by César Manrique in the square of the architect Miguel Martín-Fernández de la Torre; El pescador (The fisherman, 2002), work in bronze and stainless steel by Chano Navarro; Los nadadores. Homenaje a la travesía "Peña la Vieja" (The swimmers. Homage to the crossing "Peña la Vieja", 2003), cube and silhouettes in Corten steel by the local artist, Miguel Panadero.

 Beach murals

The desire to harmonize modern constructions with the idiosyncrasy of the beach has resulted in some characteristic murals, painted between December 1993 and April 1994, on some of the dividing walls, in which marine motifs and the blue of the sea predominate. This action was developed by dividing the beach into two sections, and the works were commissioned to three artists who had their studio and residence in Las Canteras. The first section of the space covered from Playa Chica to La Puntilla and was intervened by José Antonio García Álvarez and Fernando Álamo. The second section, from Playa Chica to La Cícer, was assigned to Manuel Padorno, who had his residence in the same area of the beach.

 Monument to Alfredo Kraus

Majestic bronze sculpture of the famous Gran Canarian tenor Alfredo Kraus, located just 80 meters from the auditorium that bears his name, in the "Jardines de los Puertos Atlánticos" that close the west side of Playa de Las Canteras. The work was commissioned by the city to the sculptor and architect Víctor Ochoa Sierra to commemorate Kraus on the anniversary of his death. It has a height of 8.45 meters and a triangular base of approximately 4 × 4 x 4 meters. The statue is of cast bronze decomposed into plates, later welded in overlapping horizontal rings. The monument has a total weight of about 3 tons and is mounted on an interior steel structure of 3 tons, fixed on a slightly inclined base of 2.20 meters high in the shape of an isosceles triangle, 21 m on its larger sides and 16 m on the back, incardinated as an arrow facing the ocean. A reinforced concrete block goes 12 meters deep to cement the whole assembly, reaching a total height of 23 meters (10.60 above ground) equivalent to a seven-storey building. It was inaugurated by the Mayor of Las Palmas de Gran Canaria, José Manuel Soria, and the tenor's family in February 2001.

 Alfredo Kraus Auditorium and Conference Center of the Canary Islands

These are two emblematic works of the Catalan architect Óscar Tusquets Blanca, inaugurated in 1997. The auditorium occupies a privileged end of the beach and stands on it, sometimes as a lighthouse, sometimes as an isolated fortress of enormous proportions, independent of its surroundings, whose plant sits on a plinth of volcanic rock that the sculptor Juan Bordes turned, with his works, into an inhabited rock. Together with the conference center, they have 13,200 m2 of usable space in which eleven halls can accommodate from a meeting for twenty people to a large congress or convention for 2,500. The Symphonic Hall, in the auditorium, has the largest capacity, with 1,656 seats and a large window behind the stage overlooking the Atlantic.

 Headquarters of the Philharmonic Orchestra of Gran Canaria and the Plaza de la Música

In the Plaza de Música, located in the area of El Rincón, behind the auditorium, is the headquarters of the philharmonic orchestra and the Congress Palace of Gran Canaria. At one end of the square, the headquarters of the philharmonic orchestra serves as a rehearsal place and as a support for the orchestra's activities.

 Monument to the Atlante

Tony Gallardo's work inaugurated by the Monarchs of Spain Don Juan Carlos and Doña Sofía in 1986, located far from the beach, on a promontory next to the north entrance of the city. It is made entirely of volcanic rock from La Isleta and recalls stories of immense valleys and ravines, which are symbolized in this figure of a woman who, with her open arms, glorifies the Atlantic.

 Environmental management

Las Canteras has an environmental management system for the integral management of the beach environment, implemented in accordance with the UNE-EN ISO 14001:2004 norm, and certified since 2004. This environmental management quality certificate guarantees and establishes guidelines to ensure that all services and work carried out on the beach are carried out with the utmost respect for the natural environment.

 Blue Flags

The quality of the beach and its services has also been recognized year after year, uninterruptedly since 1989, with the awarding of the Blue Flag, which guarantees that the waters, cleanliness, surveillance and lifeguard and lifeguard services on the beach are optimal. On 5 June 2007, the Playa de Las Canteras raised the Blue Flag for that year.

 Quality flag

This symbol is waving at the height of the spa on Tomás Miller Street and guarantees quality, safety and professionalism in all the services offered on the beach, in addition to ensuring users and visitors the best possible tourist experience. The capital's beach is the first sandy area of the archipelago to receive this recognition for the quality of its services awarded by the Institute for Spanish Tourism Quality.

Environmental problems 
The accumulation of sand is one of the negative aspects for the environment of Playa de Las Canteras. The sand is carried by the sea currents and the wind. In the past, the sea deposited it on the beach so that, on dry land, it would continue its natural route from Las Canteras to Playa de Las Alcaravaneras, thus forming a wide field of dunes that extended beyond the south of the isthmus, until it reached Arenales, a district of the city that would take its name from this dune formation. The construction of the promenade and the buildings in the area, which intensified from the first decades of the 20th century onwards, hindered the natural passage of the sand and, consequently, caused it to accumulate irremediably in Las Canteras.

However, the problem of sand accumulation is not new. As early as 1884, the engineer Juan de León y Castillo sent a report to the scientific society Museo Canario to study possible solutions that never solved the problem. In the 21st century, the maximum accumulation of sand occurs between two points at the northern end of the beach (La Puntilla and the area of the Hotel Reina Isabel), with the bay taking in some 300 cubic meters per month, which, over the years and if not remedied, will fill the dock until the shore of the beach starts from La Barra. The contributions, which increase month after month, have been depleting the flora and, as a consequence, the fauna of the beach; therefore, on numerous occasions the controlled dredging of the seabed has been requested. However, the plans that the Directorate General of Coasts of the Spanish Ministry of the Environment has tried to implement to dredge and redistribute the sand have always met with opposition from neighbors and beach users.

Flora 
The waters of Playa de Las Canteras are home to some 210 different species of algae, representing 30% of the 650 species of macroscopic algae that have been catalogued in the Canary Islands, which is indicative of the richness of the plant life present on the seabed of the beach. The reason for this abundance is due to the characteristics of the particular ecosystem between the beach and La Barra.

Bonnemaisonia hamifera is a type of red algae, within the phylum Rhodophyta, endemic to Playa de Las Canteras that does not occur anywhere else in the Canary Islands. It is a species that has two forms throughout its life cycle and one of them had never been found in the Canary Islands until it was discovered in Las Canteras.

The little Neptune grass (Cymodocea nodosa) is a type of marine phanerogam that once formed extensive meadows throughout the Bahía del Confital along with other plants, and covered approximately 75% of the sandy seabed of the beach. Many animals took refuge and lived among its groves. Such is their importance that these meadows are protected by environmental legislation, since the entire Bahía del Confital (together with the marine area of the peninsula of La Isleta) has been declared a Site of Community Importance and included in the European Union's Natura 2000 Network. Due to the problematic accumulation of sand that has been occurring in the dock for some decades, the meadows on the seabed have been dying buried under it, and the fauna they support has disappeared. At present, the articulated green algae of subtropical affinity Cymopolia barbata covers the hard substrates of a large part of the beach. The brown algae Lobophora variegata and Padina pavonica, together with the red algae Asparagopsis taxiformis, are extremely conspicuous algae throughout the beach dock.

Fauna 

Like the plant species, the animals that live on Playa de Las Canteras owe a large part of their existence to the protective action of La Barra. Thus in the waters of the beach can be found different species of pelagic (sargo, palometa, parrotfish, ornate wrasse, salemas, canary damsel, mauligobius maderensis, etc.) and living among its rocks benthic individuals such as limpets (of the genus Patella) or wide-eyed flounder (Bothus podas).

In the puddles that form at low tide we can find crabs, brittle stars and hermits living among the stones. The largest number of species are found in the puddles of the lower areas. You can also find colonies of anemones, sea urchins, starfish, several species of sponges and ascidians. Under the puddles there are some specimens of clams, shrimps, small corals of different colors, as well as cows and sea slugs. It is also not difficult to see small octopuses and cuttlefish.

Among the meadows of Las Canteras some seahorses (Hippocampus ramulosus) could be found until the 80s of the twentieth century, but they are no longer seen as a result of the progressive disappearance of these communities of seagrass. Likewise, the leopard eel Myrichthys pardalis, a scaleless fish with a snake-like shape, has suffered a decline in its populations. It is one of the most representative faunal elements of the beach, especially for the vividness of its colors.

 Birds

Although Las Canteras does not stand out as a nesting site, numerous birds can be found there, which take the opportunity to perch on the sand and rocks in the early hours of dawn, or on La Barra, when it rises at low tide, or at night when human pressure is less. In addition to seagulls, it is common to observe birds such as the Eurasian whimbrel, ruddy turnstone and little egret, catching fish in the puddles or looking for food among the rocks. In the past, before the urban development of the isthmus, there was an important colony of Alcaravaneras (Eurasian stone-curlew), a steppe bird whose abundant presence gave its name to the beach at the other end of the isthmus, the Playa de Las Alcaravaneras.

 Cetaceans

The waters that bathe La Isleta and the Bahía del Confital, in spite of the dense maritime traffic that they support given the proximity of the Puerto de La Luz, constitute one of the places chosen by some species of cetaceans and marine mammals to settle. However, Las Canteras is also an area of passage for these species in their migratory movements, which take place several miles from the coast. In many cases some of these specimens have approached the beach, probably disoriented, and some have even stranded. However, this is not an obstacle for some of these animals to decide to cross the bar and take a stroll through the waters of the beach or play among the bathers, as happened in 1983 when a group of Risso's dolphins loitered for a whole day inside the dock.

One mile northeast of La Isleta, scientists from the University of Las Palmas de Gran Canaria have noted the permanent presence of a group of common bottlenose dolphin that coexist with another group of Risso's dolphins, as well as a community of sperm whales that, according to the scientists, could move in the channel that separates the island of Gran Canaria from Fuerteventura. This marine ecosystem that surrounds the peninsula of La Isleta and serves as habitat for these mammals, has been declared a Site of Community Importance and is included in the European Union's Natura 2000 Network.

Services 

 Permanent lifeguard and first aid post (operational 365 days a year, in winter from 10 am to 5 pm and in summer from 10 am to 7 pm). Lifeguard surveillance points along the beach (in high season).
 Sports facilities and children's games.
 Easy access by public transport. Parking lots. Pedestrian promenade. Bicycle parking along the promenade.
 Hotels and apartments, restaurants and cafes on the beach and nearby.
 Access for people with reduced mobility. Ramps in access to the promenade and from the promenade to the sand. Area enabled for PRM with monitors and equipment for bathing.
 Police surveillance, with permanent post on the beach.
 Public address system, missing persons alert. Lost and found office.
 Weekly water sampling for sanitary analysis and quality control.
 Spa and checkroom. Public restrooms. Showers and footbaths.
 Rental of sun loungers and umbrellas, distributed in thirteen sectors along the beach.
 Free Internet connection through Wi-Fi technology in some points of the beach.
 Tourist information point with service in four languages. In the same avenue there is a kiosk of Tourist Information. Located in the square on Gomera Street, in front of the Hotel Meliá Las Palmas.
 Josefina de la Torre Library, permanent beach library with a selection of books published about Playa de Las Canteras, Internet connection and other activities to encourage beach reading.
 Organization of leisure and recreational activities and various events.
 Integral cleaning and conservation service for the beach and the promenade. Daily raking, oxygenation and disinfection of the sand, showers, footbaths and walkways. Selective garbage collection service. Free disposable ashtray dispensers located at each of its 28 access points.

Surfing in Las Canteras 

The waves that reach the coastline of the beach are caused by the swell that occurs in places as far away as the peninsula, England or even Canada. When winds blow strongly over the sea for a few days, short, chaotic waves form and travel across the Atlantic Ocean. During the trip, those that are grouped and form long and orderly waves, are able to travel thousands of kilometers and, thus, when they arrive in the Canary Islands, they present the conditions to be able to surf them.

Scattered around the Bahía del Confital, there are three main places to practice surfing and its modalities (bodyboard, shortboard and longboard). One is just behind the Plaza de la Música and the Alfredo Kraus Auditorium, in the southernmost part of the beach, where the Lloret wave is formed, so called because in the area were located the old fish factories Lloret and Linares now disappeared. Further to the north, in the area of the beach known as La Cícer, the biggest waves of the beach rise, as there is no bar to protect it, so it is used for beginners in the practice of surfing. Finally, in El Confital a tube is created that is used by the most experienced surfers for its speed and strong contrasts.

In Las Canteras there are surf schools that offer beginner and advanced courses and periodically organize tests and championships that score on a global scale; not in vain, those of El Lloret and El Confital are among the best waves in Europe for this sport.

 La Cícer, birthplace of surfing

La Cícer, formerly known by its original toponym Punta Brava, was the first place that welcomed the pioneers of surfing, when its practice was introduced in Gran Canaria by foreigners and peninsulars in 1970. It was a marginal area, with urban police officers and signs prohibiting bathing due to the danger of the currents, which was popularly outside the Playa de Las Canteras. In fact, in those years it was physically separated from the rest of the beach by the installations of the power plant of the Compañía Insular Colonial Electricidad y Riegos (CICER) that interrupted the continuity of the promenade in that area. The power plant, when it was installed in 1928, did so in a 16,000m² open space far from the city; decades later, as the area was urbanized, it was right on the beachfront, which was used by technicians in the 1960s to build a canal and levee, which still exists, to take and relieve the water that was used to cool the turbines of the power plant. Over the years, this dike caused an increase in sand in the area and the progressive burial of the stones and volcanic sand that made up that part of the beach. For some decades now, the CICER power plant (which has come under the control of Unelco-Endesa) has been paralyzed and partly dismantled, coming into service on rare occasions. On its site, the city council has planned the construction of social and sports facilities and a public square. However, the memory of the CICER power plant lives on in the collective imagination, which has ended up giving its name to this part of the beach.

 Characteristics of the spots in Las Canteras area
 El Lloret
 Left and right of El Lloret (Fish Factory), pebbles bottoms.
 Predominantly low tide and winds from south and southeast.
 All levels. Waves from 1 to more than 4 meters.
 Las Canteras
 La Puntilla, volcanic bottom; La Barra, volcanic bottom (several peaks); La Cícer, sandy bottom.
 Predominantly high tide and winds from south and southeast.
 All levels. Waves between 1 and 3 meters (up to 1.5 m in La Puntilla).
 El Confital
 Las Monjas, La Punta and the right side of El Confital.
 Predominance of medium and high tides and southeast winds; volcanic bottom.
 Expert level. Waves between 1.5 and more than 3 meters.

Diving in Las Canteras 

Under the waters of Playa de Las Canteras there is a space full of life, where many animals find a safe home in which to live.

The Playa de Las Canteras has two areas enabled for diving, one in the Playa Chica and the other, more extensive, in the Playa Grande. Because they are located within the inner coastal area of the dock (between the shore and La Barra), the maximum depth that can be reached at low tide is 5 meters, with an average depth of about 2 meters. These dives are of little difficulty and with occasional currents (more frequent in the area of Playa Chica), suitable for children and young people, in which the use of sophisticated equipment is not necessary. Professionals and experienced amateurs can try the outside of La Barra and Baja Fernando on days when the currents and tide allow it, or dive in the nearby Roque Matavinos, in the area of La Puntilla, a large volcanic rock formation with a very rugged bottom full of caves and tunnels where various species of penumbra fauna take refuge and where depths of about fifteen meters are reached.

Artisanal fishing in Las Canteras 

Fishing and seafood cuisine give an authentic touch to the beach. In the many terraces and restaurants of its promenade you can taste the delicacies of the place: cuttlefish, vieja a la espalda, or sancocho canario; all of them dishes made with fresh products of the sea that the fishermen who still remain in the area of La Puntilla and La Isleta go out to look for.

The small boats that sail daily in La Puntilla resist the passage of time in the midst of the technological era. They are the memory of a time not so long ago, in the mid-twentieth century, when the men of the sea went out to fish in their small boats fighting against the elements and sailing under sail or with oars. Back then there was plenty of fishing, but the money paid for the catch was little and the working conditions demanded great sacrifice. Nowadays, engines and fishing gear make the practice of the trade more bearable, but now fishing is so scarce that it is not enough to live on. Perhaps this is the last generation of artisanal fishermen of Las Canteras.

Around the 1950s, at the other end of the beach, where the Alfredo Kraus Auditorium stands today, some of the most important fish factories in the Canary Islands were located, where the canning and salting of tuna and sardines were their main manufactures. The canning industry was so booming that it monopolized all the tuna fished in the waters of the archipelago and part of the Canary Islands-Saharan fishing grounds. When, years later, refrigerators came to revolutionize the preservation of foodstuffs, the Canary Island canneries were forced to disappear.

Interesting facts 

 On days with clear skies, the entire summit of the island of Gran Canaria and part of the neighboring island of Tenerife can be seen from the beach, where the silhouette of Pico Teide can be clearly distinguished.
 Annually, coinciding with the Christmas holidays, a giant Christmas tree is placed and an allegorical nativity scene is made entirely of sand and water. In 2006, a group of seven of the best sand makers in the world gathered in Las Canteras to build the largest sand nativity scene in Spain, using 250 tons of sand to cover an area of 700 square meters.
 La Peña de la Vieja is so curiously named because from here it was easier to fish for viejas (English: old women; Sparisoma cretense), a very common species in the Canary Islands, who swim among the rocks in search of algae and invertebrates.
 Las Canteras was a film set. In La Puntilla some scenes of the movie Moby Dick were filmed in the mid 50's in which John Huston directed Gregory Peck in the role of Captain Ahab. Many whales and dolphins live offshore around the peninsula of La Isleta and on some occasions there have appeared some specimens that have come to die on the beach.
 The name Las Canteras comes from the time when La Barra was used as a stone quarry (Spanish: cantera) to build part of the Cathedral of Santa Ana, in Vegueta.
 Playa de Las Canteras is known by surfers for having two of the best waves in Europe: the wave of Lloret and El Confital, spots in which tests are held valid for the professional World Surfing Championship.
 Its promenade is the meeting point par excellence of Las Palmas de Gran Canaria, which also brings together foreign citizens who visit the city throughout the year, all of which forms a rich mix of cultures in which none loses its identity.
 According to a study carried out for the magazine Mundo Científico, Playa de Las Canteras is one of the best urban beaches in the world.
 Playa de Las Canteras aims to become the first European beach to be included in the European Network of Natural Spaces, according to a proposal of the VIII International Congress and Exhibition of Beaches – Ecoplayas, held in Las Palmas de Gran Canaria in 2006.
 It is traditional that on the Saint John's Eve, a festivity celebrated on the nights of 23 to 24 June to welcome the arrival of summer, many people from Gran Canaria and visitors gather on the Paseo de Las Canteras to watch the fireworks and to take a night swim in the waters of the beach, sometimes gathering thousands of people in what has become known as a very popular festival both in the city and on the island.

Panoramic views

See also 

 Las Palmas de Gran Canaria

Notes

References

Bibliography

External links 

 Beaches of Las Palmas de Gran Canaria (in Spanish) in the Beach Guide of the Spanish Ministry of Environment.
 Real time camera on a page dedicated to Playa de Las Canteras.
 Playa de Las Canteras in Canarias.com.
 The specialized website about Playa de Las Canteras beach. (in Spanish)

Blue Flag beaches
Beaches of Spain
Surfing locations
Las Palmas
Gran Canaria